The 2017–18 Rain or Shine Elasto Painters season was the 12th season of the franchise in the Philippine Basketball Association (PBA).

Key dates

2017
October 29: The 2017 PBA draft took place in Midtown Atrium, Robinson Place Manila.

Draft picks

Roster

Philippine Cup

Eliminations

Standings

Game log

|- style="background:#bfb;"
| 1
| December 22
| TNT
| W 82–79
| Beau Belga (14)
| Raymond Almazan (10)
| Belga, Daquioag (3)
| Cuneta Astrodome
| 1–0
|- style="background:#fcc;"
| 2
| December 29
| Blackwater
| L 87–92
| Chris Tiu (14)
| Raymond Almazan (11)
| Belga, Tiu (4)
| Cuneta Astrodome
| 1–1

|- style="background:#fcc;"
| 3
| January 12
| GlobalPort
| L 70–78
| Gabe Norwood (15)
| Beau Belga (9)
| Maverick Ahanmisi (4)
| Mall of Asia Arena
| 1–2
|- style="background:#bfb;"
| 4
| January 17
| Phoenix
| W 120–99
| Ed Daquioag (21)
| Beau Belga (7)
| Chris Tiu
| Smart Araneta Coliseum
| 2–2
|- style="background:#fcc;"
| 5
| January 20
| Kia
| L 94–98
| Rey Nambatac (12)
| Rey Nambatac (12)
| Maverick Ahanmisi (4)
| Cuneta Astrodome
| 2–3
|- style="background:#bfb;"
| 6
| January 26
| NLEX
| W 97–86
| Maverick Ahanmisi (20)
| Gabe Norwood (9)
| Beau Belga (6)
| Smart Araneta Coliseum
| 3–3

|- style="background:#bfb;"
| 7
| February 2
| Meralco
| W 90–84
| Chris Tiu (18)
| Beau Belga (13)
| Chris Tiu (7)
| Mall of Asia Arena
| 4–3
|- style="background:#bfb;"
| 8
| February 10
| Magnolia
| W 101–95
| Raymond Almazan (23)
| Maverick Ahanmisi (8)
| Chris Tiu (6)
| Calasiao Sports Complex
| 5–3
|- style="background:#fcc;"
| 9
| February 23
| Alaska
| L 95–99
| Maverick Ahanmisi (23)
| Raymond Almazan (9)
| Maverick Ahanmisi (5)
| Smart Araneta Coliseum
| 5–4
|- style="background:#bfb;"
| 10
| February 28
| San Miguel
| W 95–80
| Beau Belga (19)
| Maverick Ahanmisi (11)
| Maverick Ahanmisi (7)
| Mall of Asia Arena
| 6–4

|- style="background:#fcc;"
| 11
| March 2
| TNT
| L 92–100 (3OT)
| Beau Belga (17)
| Gabe Norwood (10)
| Belga, Norwood (5)
| Smart Araneta Coliseum
| 6–5

Playoffs

Bracket

Game log

|- style="background:#fcc;"
| 1
| March 5
| Barangay Ginebra
| L 80–88
| Beau Belga (17)
| Norwood, Ponferada (6)
| Ahanmisi, Tiu (3)
| Mall of Asia Arena
| 0–1
|- style="background:#fcc;"
| 2
| March 7
| Barangay Ginebra
| L 91–99
| Maverick Ahanmisi (18)
| Raymond Almazan (13)
| Maverick Ahanmisi (5)
| Smart Araneta Coliseum
| 0–2

Commissioner's Cup

Eliminations

Standings

Game log

|- style="background:#bfb;"
| 1
| April 27
| Alaska
| W 109–103 (OT)
| Reggie Johnson (32)
| Reggie Johnson (22)
| Gabe Norwood (8)
| Smart Araneta Coliseum
| 1–0
|- style="background:#bfb;"
| 1
| April 29
| Barangay Ginebra
| W 108–89
| Raymond Almazan (20)
| Reggie Johnson (15)
| Chris Tiu (7)
| Smart Araneta Coliseum
| 2–0

|- style="background:#bfb;"
| 3
| May 2
| NLEX
| W 98–97
| Reggie Johnson (27)
| Reggie Johnson (14)
| Norwood, Tiu (5)
| Ynares Center
| 3–0
|- style="background:#fcc;"
| 4
| May 9
| Columbian
| L 96–104
| Reggie Johnson (30)
| Reggie Johnson (17)
| Gabe Norwood (6)
| Mall of Asia Arena
| 3–1
|- style="background:#bfb;"
| 5
| May 13
| San Miguel
| W 123–119 (OT)
| Reggie Johnson (27)
| Reggie Johnson (19)
| Chris Tiu (6)
| Ynares Center
| 4–1
|- style="background:#bfb;"
| 6
| May 20
| GlobalPort
| W 96–90
| Reggie Johnson (18)
| Reggie Johnson (16)
| Reggie Johnson (7)
| Smart Araneta Coliseum
| 5–1
|- align="center"
|colspan="9" bgcolor="#bbcaff"|All-Star Break

|- style="background:#bfb;"
| 7
| June 2
| Magnolia
| W 99–96 (OT)
| Reggie Johnson (23)
| Reggie Johnson (18)
| Johnson, Tiu (4)
| Smart Araneta Coliseum
| 6–1
|- style="background:#bfb;"
| 8
| June 8
| Blackwater
| W 104–94
| Raymond Almazan (26)
| Reggie Johnson (20)
| Chris Tiu (10)
| Smart Araneta Coliseum
| 7–1
|- style="background:#bfb;"
| 9
| June 16
| Phoenix
| W 108–106
| Reggie Johnson (32)
| Reggie Johnson (16)
| three players (5)
| Mall of Asia Arena
| 8–1
|- style="background:#bfb;"
| 10
| June 24
| Meralco
| W 106–99 (OT)
| Reggie Johnson (21)
| Reggie Johnson (18)
| Maverick Ahanmisi (6)
| Smart Araneta Coliseum
| 9–1

|- style="background:#fcc;"
| 11
| July 7
| TNT
| L 85–100
| Reggie Johnson (12)
| Reggie Johnson (14)
| three players (3)
| Smart Araneta Coliseum
| 9–2

Playoffs

Bracket

Game log

|- style="background:#fcc;"
| 1
| July 10
| GlobalPort
| L 113–114
| Reggie Johnson (24)
| Reggie Johnson (25)
| Maverick Ahanmisi (8)
| Smart Araneta Coliseum
| 0–1
|- style="background:#bfb;"
| 1
| July 12
| GlobalPort
| W 103–97
| Reggie Johnson (29)
| Johnson, Norwood (15)
| Reggie Johnson (6)
| Mall of Asia Arena
| 1–1

|- style="background:#fcc;"
| 1
| July 15
| Barangay Ginebra
| L 89–102
| Reggie Johnson (30)
| Reggie Johnson (13)
| Belga, Tiu (4)
| Smart Araneta Coliseum
| 0–1
|- style="background:#bfb;"
| 2
| July 19
| Barangay Ginebra
| W 109–100
| Reggie Johnson (25)
| Reggie Johnson (20)
| Reggie Johnson (8)
| Smart Araneta Coliseum
| 1–1
|- style="background:#fcc;"
| 3
| July 21
| Barangay Ginebra
| L 72–75
| Reggie Johnson (13)
| Reggie Johnson (22)
| Belga, Johnson (4)
| Mall of Asia Arena
| 1–2
|- style="background:#fcc;"
| 4
| July 23
| Barangay Ginebra
| L 94–96
| Reggie Johnson (22)
| Reggie Johnson (16)
| Gabe Norwood (6)
| Smart Araneta Coliseum
| 1–3

Governors' Cup

Eliminations

Standings

Game log

|- style="background:#fcc;"
| 1
| September 22
| TNT
| L 104–110
| J'Nathan Bullock (23)
| Raymond Almazan (10)
| J'Nathan Bullock (5)
| City of Passi Arena
| 0–1
|- style="background:#fcc;"
| 2
| September 26
| Magnolia
| L 76–92
| J'Nathan Bullock (15)
| J'Nathan Bullock (10)
| Maverick Ahanmisi (4)
| Smart Araneta Coliseum
| 0–2

|- style="background:#fcc;"
| 3
| October 3
| Alaska
| L 89–106
| Beau Belga (20)
| Terrence Watson (13)
| Belga, Nambatac (5)
| Smart Araneta Coliseum
| 0–3
|- style="background:#fcc;"
| 4
| October 7
| Blackwater
| L 93–99
| Maverick Ahanmisi (25)
| Terrence Watson (14)
| Belga, Nambatac (4)
| Sta. Rosa Multi-Purpose Complex
| 0–4
|- style="background:#bfb;"
| 5
| October 13
| Barangay Ginebra
| W 104–97
| Terrence Watson (29)
| Terrence Watson (19)
| Ed Daquioag (6)
| Quezon Convention Center
| 1–4
|- style="background:#bfb;"
| 6
| October 17
| NorthPort
| W 120–98
| Chris Tiu (23)
| Beau Belga (12)
| Maverick Ahanmisi (9)
| Cuneta Astrodome
| 2–4
|- style="background:#fcc;"
| 7
| October 19
| Columbian
| L 84–100
| Terrence Watson (18)
| Terrence Watson (10)
| Maverick Ahanmisi (4)
| Ynares Center
| 2–5
|- style="background:#fcc;"
| 8
| October 21
| Meralco
| L 82–91
| Norbert Torres (16)
| Terrence Watson (13)
| Maverick Ahanmisi (5)
| Smart Araneta Coliseum
| 2–6
|- style="background:#fcc;"
| 9
| October 24
| Phoenix
| L 97–103
| Chris Tiu (24)
| Norbert Torres (8)
| Ahanmisi, Norwood (4)
| Cuneta Astrodome
| 2–7
|- style="background:#fcc;"
| 10
| October 27
| San Miguel
| L 97–109
| Maverick Ahanmisi (26)
| Terrence Watson (15)
| Maverick Ahanmisi (6)
| Alonte Sports Arena
| 2–8

|- style="background:#bfb;"
| 11
| November 3
| NLEX
| W 107–101
| Chris Tiu (30)
| Norbert Torres (13)
| Chris Tiu (5)
| Smart Araneta Coliseum
| 3–8

Transactions

Free agency signings

Trades

Philippine Cup

Recruited imports

Awards

References

Rain or Shine Elasto Painters seasons
Rain or Shine